In Walked Sonny is an album by American jazz musicians Sonny Stitt and Art Blakey with The Jazz Messengers. It was released in 1975 on the small independent label Sonet Records and is among the most obscure recordings made by the musicians involved in the project.

Track listing

"Blues March" (Benny Golson)- 7:29
"It Might as Well Be Spring"  (Richard Rodgers, Oscar Hammerstein II) - 6:03
"Birdlike" (Freddie Hubbard) - 7:40
"I Can't Get Started"  (George Gershwin, Vernon Duke) - 4:43
"Ronnie's a Dynamite Lady" (Walter Davis, Jr.) - 8:16
"In Walked Sonny" (Sonny Stitt) - 11:06
 
Bonus tracks on CD reissue:
"Birdlike" [Alternate Take] - 5:53
"Ronnie's a Dynamite Lady" [Alternate Take] - 8:35

Personnel
Sonny Stitt - alto and tenor saxophone
Art Blakey - drums
Walter Davis, Jr. - piano
Bill Hardman - trumpet
David Schnitter - tenor saxophone
Yoshio "Chin" Suzuki - bass

References

Sonny Stitt albums
Art Blakey albums
The Jazz Messengers albums
1975 albums